The Antequera Dolmens Site is a cultural heritage ensemble comprising three cultural monuments (the Dolmen of Menga, Dolmen of Viera and Tholos of El Romeral) and 2 natural mountain features (the Peña de los Enamorados and El Torcal) in and near the city of Antequera in Andalusia, Spain. The cultural institution responsible for its protection is the CADA (Archeological Ensemble Dolmens of Antequera). It was declared a World Heritage Site in 2016.

Outstanding Universal Value
For something to be declared World Heritage Site, it must demonstrate exceptional universal value; that is, an extraordinary importance transcending national borders and of interest to present and future generations of all humanity.

UNESCO requires justification of at least one of the six criteria set for the cultural heritage by the Convention on the Protection of the World Cultural and Natural Heritage (1972) to demonstrate the exceptional universal value of the site. The proposal of the Antequera Dolmens Site is based on one of them (i); the International Council on Monuments and Sites in its final report incorporates other two (iii, iv).

 Criterion (i): "represent a masterpiece of the human creative genius"

The Neolithic Dolmen of Menga represents one of the most important masterpiece of megalithic architecture (Atlantic tradition) based on post-and-lintel construction with an earthen covering, notable for its enormous dimensions that push the size possible in a corridor sepulcher by incorporating the unprecedented solution of intermediate pillars; likewise, the later, Chalcolithic tholos (beehive tomb) of El Romeral complements the two dolmens with its corridor and false dome of drystone masonry (Mediterranean tradition).

 Criterion (iii): "provide a unique testimony, or at least exceptional, on a cultural tradition or a living or dead civilization"

Both the Dolmen of Menga and the Tholos of El Romeral have anomalous orientations. The archaeoastronomer Michael Hoskin, who studied the site, noted that, whereas the axes of almost all dolmens around the Mediterranean are oriented to a celestial feature, such as sunrise at dawn on the equinoxes (as occurs in the Dolmen of Viera), the Dolmen of Menga points to the striking nearby peak called the Peña de los Enamorados. This rises abruptly from the plain and contains the contemporaneous rock shelter of Matacabras, in which cave paintings are found. Meanwhile, the Tholos of El Romeral is oriented to the mountains of El Torcal, containing the Cave of the Bull (terrestrial orientation), as well as to the noon sun on the winter solstice (celestial orientation). El Torcal is noted for the extensive, otherworldly karst landscape at its summit. In addition, the Tholos of El Romeral lies along an axis from the Dolmen of Menga to the Peña de los Enamorados. Thus, the Dolmens of Antequera construct a unique megalithic landscape by their relationship with the surrounding natural elements.

 Criterion (iv): "be an outstanding example of a type of building or architectural or technological ensemble or landscape which illustrates one or several significant periods of human history"

The three megalithic monuments reflect a stage of human history in which the first ceremonial monuments in Western Europe were built, according to the two major building traditions of megalithic art (lintel and beehive). This is an unusual proposal on the List of World Heritage Sites as it is not being put forward as a mixed heritage site, in which its cultural value would be added to its natural value, but as an integration and close dialogue between the megalithic architecture and the landscape. A phenomenon of "landscape monumentalization" has occurred here by which the natural landmarks acquire the value of monuments while the manmade constructs present the appearance of a natural landscape.

Finally, the authenticity of the megaliths is well established, with the Dolmen of Menga dating to the Neolithic and the Tholos of El Romeral to the Chalcolithic, and the structures retain high integrity, being in good condition and well maintained.

See also 
 Prehistoric Iberia
 Dolmen of Menga
 Dolmen of Viera
 Tholos of El Romeral
 Dolmen de Soto
 Dolmen de la Pastora
 Megalithic Monuments of Alcalar
 Peña de los Enamorados
 El Torcal de Antequera
 Antequera

References

Bibliography

External links 
 Antequera Dolmens Site on the List of UNESCO World Heritage Sites
 Declaration as World Heritage Site in the 40th World Heritage Committee of UNESCO. Friday afternoon session July 15, 2016
 Presentation of the Antequera Dolmens Site on the website of the Ministry of Culture Junta de Andalucía (Regional Government of Andalusia)

World Heritage Sites in Spain
Prehistoric art
Megalithic monuments in Spain
Dolmens in Spain
Bien de Interés Cultural landmarks in the Province of Málaga
Antequera